Blonde Redhead is an American alternative rock  band composed of Kazu Makino (vocals, keys/rhythm guitar) and twin brothers Simone and Amedeo Pace (drums/keys and lead guitar/bass/keys/vocals, respectively) that formed in New York City in 1993. The band's earliest albums were noted for their noise rock influences, though their sound evolved by the early 2000s with the releases of Misery is a Butterfly (2004) and 23 (2007), which both incorporated elements of dream pop, shoegaze and other genres. They have released nine regular studio albums and have toured internationally.

Career
Amedeo and Simone Pace were born in Milan, Italy, and grew up in Montreal (Saint-Léonard), but later moved to Boston to study jazz. After earning Bachelor's degrees, they entered the New York City underground music scene. Blonde Redhead formed in New York in 1993 after Amedeo and Simone met Kazu Makino, an art student at the time, by chance at a local Italian restaurant. The band named themselves after a song on the 1981 EP A Taste of DNA by the no wave group DNA.

Blonde Redhead's self-titled debut album was released in 1995. Shortly afterwards, fourth member Maki Takahashi left the band and was replaced by her friend Toko Yasuda as bassist. Yasuda played on the band's second album La Mia Vita Violenta also released in 1995. Both records appeared on the New York label Smells Like. The band continued as a trio.

Their third album, Fake Can Be Just as Good, was released through Touch & Go in 1997. The band enlisted the help of Vern Rumsey of Unwound, who filled the role of guest bassist. Subsequent albums featured Skúli Sverrisson, who the twins knew from their time in Boston.

On their fourth album, In an Expression of the Inexpressible, Guy Picciotto of Fugazi was hired as producer. Picciotto also contributed in the construction to the song "Futurism vs. Passéism Part 2" as well as lending it his vocals to the 1998 release. In 2000 Picciotto also co-produced Melody of Certain Damaged Lemons with Ryan Hadlock, an album about the relationship between Makino and Amedeo Pace.

The four-year delay between Melody of Certain Damaged Lemons and Misery Is a Butterfly is attributed to Makino's recovery time after being trampled by a horse. Much of the visual and lyrical imagery of Misery Is a Butterfly is reflective of the accident, especially in the music video for "Equus." It was the last time Picciotto produced the band.

In 2006 Makino recorded vocals for the film Sisters. Alan Moulder mixed the trio's album 23 which was released on 4AD, in April 2007.

In mid-2008, they wrote and recorded the score of the documentary feature film The Dungeon Masters. The film premiered at the Toronto International Film Festival and was released on February 12, 2010; a soundtrack album was released in July 2010. In 2009, Blonde Redhead contributed to the AIDS benefit album Dark Was the Night produced by the Red Hot Organization.

In March 2010 the band included a demo version of the song "Not Getting There" on a 4AD sampler entitled Fragments From Work In Progress. Their eighth album, Penny Sparkle, was released in September 2010 through 4AD. The album was again mixed by Alan Moulder, and reached 79 in the Billboard 200 chart. For the subsequent tour the band added a key-board player. The band released a six-track remix EP in July 2011.

A year later, the band started the project for their next album but without the support of 4AD. Self-financed, the band embarked on a haphazard recording schedule with producer Drew Brown. Simone Pace noted about Brown's involvement that "he has so much experience and definitely dictated the direction of the record; the choices of instruments, concept and that it was minimal." He forced the band to use analogue instruments.

In April 2014 their song "For the Damaged Coda" was used in an episode of the first season of the cartoon Rick and Morty. The use of this song was again repeated in April 2017 in the third season. The use of the song became an important plot device regarding the character "Evil Morty" for the series. Around 2018 this song became an Internet meme expressing the sadness one feels at the worst moments of one's life.

The band released their ninth album, Barragán, on September 2, 2014, through Kobalt. It was preceded by the single "No More Honey" that appeared in June. It was followed by the second single, "Dripping," which included a video. The band also provided the soundtrack to the Danish film The Commentator.

In June 2016 it was announced that the band would release the box set Masculin Féminin on September 30 through The Numero Group. It contains 37 tracks, which cover the first two albums, associated singles, radio sessions and unreleased demos from the period. In 2017, the band released the EP 3 O'Clock, which comprises four songs and featured contributions from Eyvind Kang, Michael Leonhart, Sam Owens and Mauro Refosco, among others.

In September 2019, Kazu Makino released her first solo album, Adult Baby, which featured Ryuichi Sakamoto (on piano, field recordings, and "organic instruments"), Ian Chang and Greg Saunier (drums), and Mauro Refosco (percussion).

The band will be touring the US in 2022 on select dates supporting Tool.

Members
Current members
 Kazu Makino – rhythm guitar, keyboards, vocals (1993–present)
 Amedeo Pace – lead guitar, bass, keyboards, vocals (1993–present)
 Simone Pace – drums, keyboards (1993–present)

Former members
 Maki Takahashi – bass (1993–1995)
 Toko Yasuda – bass (1995)

Timeline

Gallery

Discography

Albums

EPs

Singles

Soundtracks

Compilations and Remix Albums

References

External links
 Blonde Redhead official website
 Blonde Redhead on 4AD Records
 
Interview with Submerge Magazine "The Changelings" November, 2010
Indie Pop Fever review of "Penny Sparkle"

1993 establishments in New York City
Musical groups established in 1995
Alternative rock groups from New York (state)
American experimental rock groups
American noise rock music groups
Dream pop musical groups
Indie rock musical groups from New York (state)
American shoegaze musical groups
Touch and Go Records artists
4AD artists
Sibling musical groups